In geometric probability theory, Wendel's theorem, named after James G. Wendel, gives the probability that N points distributed uniformly at random on an -dimensional hypersphere all lie on the same "half" of the hypersphere.  In other words, one seeks the probability that there is some half-space with the origin on its boundary that contains all N points.  Wendel's theorem says that the probability is
 

The statement is equivalent to  being the probability that the origin is not contained in the convex hull of the N points and holds for any probability distribution on  that is symmetric around the origin. In particular this includes all distribution which are rotationally invariant around the origin.

This is essentially a probabilistic restatement of Schläfli's theorem that  hyperplanes in general position in  divides it into  regions.

References

Probability theorems
Theorems in geometry